Idi or IDI may refer to:

People
 Idi Amin (c. 1925–2003), President of Uganda and military officer
 Idi b. Abin Naggara, 4th century Jewish Babylonian rabbi
 Idi Othman Guda (1941–2015), Nigerian politician
 Idi Papez, Austrian 1930s pair skater

Acronym
 ICT Development Index, an index published by the United Nations International Telecommunication Union
 Image Diffusion International, a television production company
 Inclusive Development Index, an annual economic index
 Indian Diamond Institute, school in the fields of diamonds, gems and jewellery in India
 Industrial Developments International, a privately held real estate investment trust
 Infectious Diseases Institute, a Ugandan not-for-profit organization
 Inspector Dawood Ibrahim, a 2016 Indian Malayalam action-comedy film
 Institut de Droit International, an organization devoted to the study of international law
 Interactive Design Institute, Edinburgh, providing online courses in art and design
 International Diving Institute
 Israel Democracy Institute, a research center dedicated to strengthening Israeli democracy
 Israel Diamond Institute, a non-profit public interest company in Israel

Other uses
 Idi language, a language of Papua New Guinea
 Iði or Idi, a giant in Norse mythology
 IDI, IATA code for Indiana County–Jimmy Stewart Airport, a business service airport in Indiana, Pennsylvania